Gabriela Ofelia Cano Gamboa (born April 6, 1977) professionally known as Gabriela Cano and as Gaby Cano, is a Mexican actress, film producer and director, and theatre producer and director.

Television credits 
Simplemente Renata - Ingrid de la Macorra 
Amar otra vez - Molly Chamorro Beltrán  
Clase 406 - Aurora
Mujer, casos de la vida real
El juego de la vida - Araceli Fuentes 
Epilogo: Primer amor... tres años después Melissa 
Primer amor... a mil por hora - Melissa Molina 
La pobre Señorita Limantour - Regina Limantour (girl) 
Garabatos - Susy (Pilot show)

Discography
 Wanda Band, "Cartas de una Chica Misteriosa" (Fonovisa Record Company)
 Éden Band, "Por tí"

Sources

Mexican telenovela actresses
Living people
1977 births